Stri Purush Tulana (Hindi:स्त्रीपुरुषतुलना) (A comparison between men and women) is a pamphlet/book written by feminist activist Tarabai Shinde. Shinde was a writer born in the Berar province of Buldhana (present day Maharashtra) who protested against patriarchy and the caste system. She was a member of the Satyashodhak Samaj and was also an associate of Savitribai Phule and Jyotirao Phule. The pamphlet was originally published in Marathi in 1882. The literary work is a critique of patriarchy and the gender and caste system in 19th century India. The material is also considered the first modern feminist text of India. Shinde questions the position of women in the society and their rights.

Description and analysis
Stri Purush Tulana was a reaction to a newspaper article in Pune Vaibhav, an orthodox newspaper which supported the caste and gender system. The article was written attacking a young Brahmin widow Vijayalakshmi who was sentenced for execution for aborting her illegitimate child fearing public disgrace and ostracism. The article also criticized women in general, for their changing morals and behavior. Shinde reacted firmly against this through her work. Though the book received negative views from the society, Jyotirao Phule appreciated Shinde's work and also referenced it in his magazine, 'Satsar'

Stri Purush Tulana, when published in 1882, remained virtually unknown but later became known after it was republished in 1975 by S.G Malshe.

The book starts by Shinde questioning the Gods.

The book also criticizes the caste system, patriarchy, denial of education to women, polygamy, ban on widow remarriage and many other practices which opposed women.

References

1882 non-fiction books
Marathi-language literature
19th-century Indian books
Indian literature
Feminist books
Pamphlets
Indian books